Tom and Jerry Special Shorts is a short-lived American animated television series based on Tom and Jerry that premiered and ended on HBO Max on February 20, 2021, making it the shortest lived of any Tom and Jerry related shows. The series is developed by Peter Browngardt and produced by Warner Bros. Animation. The shorts featured the archived uncredited voices of William Hanna alongside Andrew Dickman.

The shorts are featured in the style of Looney Tunes Cartoons, another short series developed by Browngardt.

Cast and characters

Main 
 William Hanna and Andrew Dickman as: 
 Tom Cat: Tom is variously depicted as a house cat doing his job, and a victim of Jerry's tricks, sometimes within the same short.
 Jerry Mouse: Jerry lives in the same house as Tom's owners, allowing chaos and destruction to ensue while he and Tom fight.

Notable guest stars 
 Keone Young as Sushi Chef: Appearing in "On a Roll", the character is a simple chef that was cooking food and notices Jerry stealing some of his sushi, leading to Tom being ordered to get that mouse.

Episodes

Production 

In February 2021, the shorts debuted on HBO Max with no prior announcement. Thought to be promotional marketing for the Tom & Jerry film, the shorts received positive reception from fans and critics. According to Andrew Dickman, the series was worked on the crews spare time while on the production of Looney Tunes Cartoons.

Removal from HBO Max 
One month after the series' release, it temporarily left the service. The reason of the removal from HBO Max was unknown, but it was eventually re-added in July 2021. The series is currently no longer listed as its own program, but as two extras on the page for the Tom & Jerry film.

See also 
 The Tom and Jerry Show (1975)
 The Tom and Jerry Comedy Show
 Tom & Jerry Kids
 Tom and Jerry Tales
 The Tom and Jerry Show (2014)
 Tom and Jerry in New York

Notes

References

External links
 

2020s American animated television series
2020s American children's comedy television series
2020s American surreal comedy television series
2021 American television series debuts
2021 American television series endings
American flash animated television series
American children's animated comedy television series
Animated television series reboots
Slapstick comedy
Tom and Jerry television series
English-language television shows
HBO Max original programming
Animated television series about cats
Animated television series about mice and rats
Television shows set in the United States
Television series set in 2021
Television series impacted by the COVID-19 pandemic
Television series created by Peter Browngardt
Television series by Warner Bros. Animation